Greatest Hits Live! is a Sammy Hagar live album. It is a compilation of live tracks from his officially released live albums, All Night Long and Live 1980

Track listing
 "Red" (John Carter/Sammy Hagar) - 5:00
 "Trans Am (Highway Wonderland)" (Sammy Hagar) - 5:12
 "Love or Money" (Sammy Hagar) - 3:39
 "Bad Motor Scooter" (Sammy Hagar) - 7:04
 "Rock 'n' Roll Weekend" (Sammy Hagar) - 3:53
 "Turn Up the Music" (John Carter/Sammy Hagar) - 5:27
 "Plain Jane" (Sammy Hagar) - 2:33
 "This Planet's on Fire (Burn in Hell)" (Sammy Hagar) - 4:31
 "I've Done Everything for You" (Sammy Hagar) - 3:11
 "Space Station #5" (Sammy Hagar/Ronnie Montrose) - 4:17

Sammy Hagar albums
2003 live albums
2003 greatest hits albums